AC-262536 is a drug developed by Acadia Pharmaceuticals which acts as a selective androgen receptor modulator (SARM). Chemically it possesses endo-exo isomerism, with the endo form being the active form. It acts as a partial agonist for the androgen receptor with a Ki of 5nM, and no significant affinity for any other receptors tested. In animal studies it produced a maximal effect of around 66% of the anabolic action of testosterone, but only around 27% of its potency as an androgen.

See also 
 ACP-105
 Enobosarm
 JNJ-28330835
 Ligandrol

References 

Secondary alcohols
Naphthalenes
Nitriles
Selective androgen receptor modulators
Tropanes